Rehan Naufal Kusharjanto (born 28 February 2000) is an Indonesian badminton player affiliated with Djarum club.

Early life and career 
His father Tri Kusharjanto, is an Olympic silver medalist in badminton in 2000, and his mother Sri Untari, was an Asian Champion in 1992. He started practicing badminton with his father at the age of 5, and joined the Djarum club in 2013. He was the champion at the 2016 Asian U-17 Junior Championships in the boys' doubles event partnered with Haffiz Nur Adila, and in 2017, he clinched the mixed doubles title at the Asian Junior Championships with Siti Fadia Silva Ramadhanti. He was also a two-times mixed doubles World Junior Championship silver medalists in 2017 and 2018 with Ramadhanti.

2022 
In March, Kusharjanto and his partner Lisa Ayu Kusumawati reached their first BWF World Tour final in the Orléans Masters, but lost to Singaporean pair Terry Hee and Tan Wei Han. This year, they debuted at the BWF World Championships, In October, they reached another final in the Vietnam Open but lost to fellow Indonesians Dejan Ferdinansyah and Gloria Emanuelle Widjaja. They also reached the semi finals of the French Open, but lost to Dutch pair Robin Tabeling and Selena Piek. In November, they claimed their first ever BWF World Tour title at the Hylo Open by defeating Feng Yanzhe and Huang Dongping in the final in straight games. Their progress, particularly their victory at the Hylo Open, led them to break through the world top 20 in mixed doubles.

2023 
Kusharjanto and Kusumawati opened the 2023 season at the Malaysia Open, but lost to Malaysian pair Chen Tang Jie and Toh Ee Wei at the second round. At the next tournament, they lost again in second round of the India Open from top seed Zheng Siwei and Huang Yaqiong of China. They competed at the home tournament, Indonesia Masters, but lost to Japanese pair Kyohei Yamashita and Naru Shinoya at the first round They suffered a fourth consecutive early exit at the Thailand Masters, this time falling to Korean pair Kim Won-ho and Jeong Na-eun at the second round.

In February, Kusharjanto was called up to the Indonesian team for the Badminton Asia Mixed Team Championships. He and Kusumawati debuted at the All England Open.

Achievements

World Junior Championships 
Mixed doubles

Asian Junior Championships 
Mixed doubles

BWF World Tour (1 title, 2 runners-up)
The BWF World Tour, which was announced on 19 March 2017 and implemented in 2018, is a series of elite badminton tournaments sanctioned by the Badminton World Federation (BWF). The BWF World Tours are divided into levels of World Tour Finals, Super 1000, Super 750, Super 500, Super 300, and the BWF Tour Super 100.

Mixed doubles

BWF International Challenge/Series (2 titles, 1 runner-up) 
Men's doubles

Mixed doubles

  BWF International Challenge tournament
  BWF International Series tournament

BWF Junior International (1 title, 3 runners-up) 
Boys' doubles

Mixed doubles

  BWF Junior International Grand Prix tournament
  BWF Junior International Challenge tournament
  BWF Junior International Series tournament
  BWF Junior Future Series tournament

Performance timeline

National team 
 Junior level

 Senior level

Individual competitions

Junior level 
 Mixed doubles

Senior level

Men's doubles

Mixed doubles

References

External links 
 

2000 births
Living people
People from Bekasi
Sportspeople from West Java
Indonesian male badminton players
21st-century Indonesian people